State elections were held in all states and territories in Malaysia except Sarawak on 9 May 2018, alongside general elections. Pakatan Harapan alliance received over 50% of the vote across the 12 states and territories where elections took place and won the most seats. They emerged as the largest faction in all states and territories except Kelantan, Terengganu, Perlis and Pahang.

Results

Perlis

Kedah

Kelantan

Terengganu

Penang

Perak

Pahang

Selangor

Negeri Sembilan

Malacca

Johor

Sabah

References

state
State elections in Malaysia